Katima Mulilo Urban Constituency is an Electoral district in Namibia. It is situated in the !Zambezi Region. The region's capital, Katima Mulilo, is in this constituency. The constituency has a population of 28,362 people. In the 2020 Regional Council Elections, there were 13,860 registered voters.

Politics
In the 2004 presidential election,  Katima Mulilo Urban voted overwhelmingly for Hifikepunye Pohamba of Swapo party. With approximately 72% of the vote, Pohamba earned about the same percentage as he did nationally. However, the Constituency voted strongly for Ben Ulenga of the Congress of Democrats, who received 1299 (17%) votes, which was more than 10% higher than his national vote total

The 2015 regional election was won by Bernard Songa Sibalatani of the SWAPO Party with 2,267 votes, followed by Robert Tariso Matongela of the Rally for Democracy and Progress (RDP) with 278 votes. The independent candidate Linus Lifasi Muchila came third with 239 votes, and Fred Waluka Mola of the Democratic Turnhalle Alliance (DTA) finished last with 154 votes. The SWAPO candidate also won the 2020 regional election. John Muchila Mukaya obtained 1,831 votes. Mweti Marklee Matengu of the Popular Democratic Movement (PDM, the new name of the DTA) came second with 557 votes, followed by Poniso Shrunk Kubwima, an independent candidate who received 369 votes.

References

Constituencies of Zambezi Region
Katima Mulilo